Erick Joel Monzón (born November 30, 1981 in San Juan, Puerto Rico) is a Minor League Baseball second baseman in the Long Island Ducks organization. He was signed as a non-drafted free agent May 22,  by Mariners scout Mark Leavitt. Monzón attended the University of Tampa.

Professional career

Seattle Mariners
He was soon promoted to the Inland Empire 66ers on June 25. There he recorded 11 multi-hit games and had two multi-home run games. Later that season he was placed on the disabled list from August 23 to September 17 with a strain left knee. He finished the season with a .346 batting average, seven home runs and 21 RBIs in 34 combined games.

In  Monzón spent his season with the 66rs. He hit .271 with 13 home runs and 49 RBIs in 94 games. He again found himself on the disabled list with a torn right hamstring after running the bases.

Starting the season with Inland Empire, Monzón soon found himself promoted to the Double-A San Antonio Missions where he hit .245 in 78 games. He was transferred to the Triple-A Tacoma Rainiers on July 4 and back to San Antonio on July 12. His combined season totals was an average of .250 with five home runs and 48 RBIs. Monzón faced Roger Clemens in one of Clemens' rehab starts at the Double-A level. Monzón got a single off of Clemens.

In  Monzón was promoted to the Double-A West Tenn Diamond Jaxx. This is where he spent his entire season, batting .222 with six home runs and 30 RBIs in 68 games. He was again on the disabled list with a strained left hamstring, April 15 to May 3.

The  season greeted Monzón with a demotion to the High Desert Mavericks, but he was soon promoted to Double-A. He had a combined batting average of .204 with five home runs and 30 RBIs. This was Monzón's worst season statistically.

Monzón began the  season with West Tennessee but was soon promoted to Tacoma. He finished the season with a combined .226 average with four doubles, five home runs and 15 RBIs.

References

External links
Career statistics and player information from Minor League Baseball, Baseball-Reference and The Baseball Cube

1981 births
Living people
Tampa Spartans baseball players
Arizona League Mariners players
Inland Empire 66ers of San Bernardino players
Tacoma Rainiers players
San Antonio Missions players
West Tennessee Diamond Jaxx players
High Desert Mavericks players